Marilyn Mitzel is a television reporter and news anchor, originally from North Dakota.

Education
Journalism at Arizona State University. She worked on her master's degree in journalism at Butler University in Indianapolis.

Awards and honours
For her work on health & medical news and WSVN:
Outstanding Achievement from the Associated Press.
Special Recognition Awards from the American Heart Association.

Emmy Awards:
A Matter of Life and Death, series.
Hope Never Dies, series.

Other awards:
The Consumer Awareness Media Award from Dade County Trial Lawyers Association.

Her series Cancer at the Pumps is cited as contributing to a change in Florida Law, requiring vapor recovery systems on all gas pumps.

Broadcasters
WJLA-TV in Washington D.C.
WRTV in Indianapolis.
WSVN in Miami.
KFYR-TV in Bismarck, North Dakota.

External links
 Marilyn Mitzel Mitzel's website

Walter Cronkite School of Journalism and Mass Communication alumni
American television journalists
American women television journalists
People from North Dakota
Television anchors from Indianapolis
Television anchors from Miami
Butler University alumni
Living people
Journalists from North Dakota
Year of birth missing (living people)
21st-century American women